Tibor Székelyhidy (20 February 1904 – 21 November 1989) was a Hungarian fencer. He competed in the team épée event at the 1936 Summer Olympics. He is buried in Farkasréti cemetery in Budapest.

References

External links
 

1904 births
1989 deaths
Sportspeople from Cluj-Napoca
Hungarian male épée fencers
Olympic fencers of Hungary
Fencers at the 1936 Summer Olympics
Burials at Farkasréti Cemetery